See also 1883 in birding and ornithology, main events of 1884 and 1885 in birding and ornithology

The year 1884 in birding and ornithology.

Worldwide

New species

 Birds described in 1884  include  Blakiston's fish owl, grey-crowned flatbill, rose-collared piha, St Kilda wren, Corsican nuthatch, golden-winged sunbird, Fischer's starling, Streak-backed antshrike, Lagden's bushshrike, Timor stubtail, brown lory, black-capped social weaver, Böhm's flycatcher

Events
 Léon Olphe-Galliard begins publishing papers on European birds.
 First meeting of International Ornithological Committee
 Gyula Madarász founds the German-language ornithological journal Zeitschrift für die gesamte Ornithologie
 Carl August Bolle becomes Chairman of  Deutsche Ornithologen-Gesellschaft 
 The Auk, the official publication of the American Ornithological Society (AOS) established

Ornithologists

Deaths
 Hermann Schlegel (10 June 1804 – 17 January 1884)

Publications
 Władysław Taczanowski,  1884. Ornithologie du Pérou. R. Friedländer & Sohn. Berlin. Vol 2: 566 pp.
 George Ernest Shelley On five new or little-known Species of East-African Birds, represented in Mr. H. H. Johnston's First Collection from the Kilimanjaro District  Proceedings of the Zoological Society of London. 1884:554-558
 Henry Eeles Dresser, A Monograph of the Meropidae, or Family of the Bee-eaters. London: self-published.(1884–1886)
 Gustav Fischer with Anton Reichenow in Journal für Ornithologie online BHL

Ongoing events
 Osbert Salvin and Frederick DuCane Godman 1879–1904. Biologia Centrali-Americana . Aves
 Richard Bowdler Sharpe Catalogue of the Birds in the British Museum London,1874–98.
 The Ibis
 Members of the German Ornithologists' Society in Journal für Ornithologie

References

Bird
Birding and ornithology by year